Love & Hip Hop: Atlanta is the second installment of the Love & Hip Hop reality television franchise. It premiered June 18, 2012 on VH1, and chronicles the lives of several people in Atlanta involved with hip hop music.

Series overview

Episodes

Season 1 (2012)

Season 2 (2013)

Season 3 (2014)

Season 4 (2015)

Season 5 (2016)

Season 6 (2017)

Season 7 (2018)

Season 8 (2019)

Season 9 (2020)

Season 10 (2021–22)

Specials

Ratings

References

External links
 

Love & Hip Hop
Lists of American reality television series episodes